The Forest Hills station is a station on the Main Line of the Long Island Rail Road (LIRR), located in the Forest Hills neighborhood of Queens in New York City. It is lightly used compared to other stations in the city, with only 1,967 weekday riders; many residents opt for the subway because of its increased service and direct express trains to Midtown Manhattan. The station is wheelchair accessible.

Location
Located in the Queens neighborhood of the same name, Forest Hills is situated on 71st Avenue (also known as Continental Avenue) between Austin and Burns Streets. It is also the northern boundary of Station Square, a historic Tudor town center, which was across from a building known as the "Forest Hills Inn." The station is also just east of the West Side Tennis Club. Two blocks to the north along 71st Avenue is the Forest Hills–71st Avenue subway station, one of the busiest in Queens.

History
Built in 1906, the Forest Hills station is one of the oldest operating passenger railway stations in New York City, predating IND subway expansion to the area in the mid 1930s. Being subsequently remodeled for handicapped accessibility with ramps, it does not contain the standard blue and white signage. Instead there are plaques and antique signs that complement the surrounding area. On July 4, 1917, former President Theodore Roosevelt made his "Unification Speech" from the steps of this station.

On March 17, 1936, at a hearing of the New York State Transit Commission and the New York State Public Service Commission, the LIRR said that it would seek permission in 1937 to abandon the three stations along the Main Line between Jamaica and Pennsylvania Station—Kew Gardens, Forest Hills, and Woodside. The LIRR had said that it anticipated a loss of annual revenue between $750,000 and $1 million with the opening of the extension of the Independent Subway System's Queens Boulevard Line to Jamaica.

The railroad's justification was that ridership at the stations was low, and did not warrant repairing the crumbling concrete. These sections of platforms had been installed in about 1929 to allow the stations to accommodate full-length trains. This move was opposed by civic groups, and resulted in an investigation by the Public Service Commission. However, the platform extensions were removed in 1965 or 1966.

The Metropolitan Transportation Authority (MTA), in its 2010–2014 capital program, proposed lengthening the four-car-long platforms at Forest Hills and Kew Gardens to allow additional train cars to board at the station. The platform extensions would reduce waiting time at the station while allowing for more efficient operations between Jamaica and Penn Station. Although $4.5 million was allocated for the project, the money was ultimately redistributed to other projects.

The platform extensions will consist of fiberglass decking supported by steel scaffolding structures, allowing the extensions to be completed quickly, and at a low cost, while allowing the LIRR to plan for a permanent solution. Preparation work began during the week of July 23 and the new extensions went into service  the week of September 12, 2018.

Station layout
A local station, Forest Hills has two side platforms, both six cars long, and four tracks. The relatively flat and straight stretch of track at Forest Hills has been used for PATH PA-1 and R44 speed tests.

Gallery

Notes

References

External links

 Burns Street entrance from Google Maps Street View
 Continental Avenue entrance from Google Maps Street View
 Platforms from Google Maps Street View

Long Island Rail Road stations in New York City
Railway stations in Queens, New York
Railway stations in the United States opened in 1911
Forest Hills, Queens
1911 establishments in New York City